Laboratorium was a contemporary art exhibition curated by Barbara Vanderlinden and Hans-Ulrich Obrist at Fotomuseum Antwerp, the Century City building and various other locations in Antwerp, Belgium, from 27 June to 3 October 1999.

The interdisciplinary exhibition staged relations between an urban network of scientists, artists, dancers and writers and questioned the role of the studio and the laboratory as sites of artistic, scientific and knowledge production.

Background
In 1998, preparations started for the 1999 celebrations of the 400th anniversary of Anthony van Dyck's birth. In honour of this event Roomade, the Brussels-based arts organisation founded Barbara Vanderlinden and Antwerpen Open, set out to create a contemporary art program in Antwerp. This was conceived of as a contemporaneous reflection on the role the 'studio' in art and a tribute to the history of famous artist studio's in Antwerp of which van Dyck's and Peter-Paul Rubens are the most prominent examples. It is this city's role in the development of such studios that inspired 'Laboratorium'. The creative aspect of the curatorial role led Barbara Vanderlinden to propose an alternative to the traditional object-oriented art exhibition by creating an exhibition program that took the form of a year long, functioning artist's studio. She fulfilled this aim by setting up a series of exceptional projects that were carried out in defunct office spaces throughout the city of Antwerp. These culminated and merged in 'Laboratorium', a large-scale interdisciplinary exhibition-project "in which the scientific laboratory and the artist's studio were explored on the basis of the various concepts and disciplines". It brought together the work of sixty-six artists and scientists devoted to research and experimentation and was co-curated by Barbara Vanderlinden and Hans Ulrich Obrist.

The preparations for the exhibition started with "a method that is often used for historical exhibitions, but too rarely for contemporary ones"  the curators created think thank to develop ideas. This included artists and scientists such as the French sociologist Bruno Latour, the German-Belgian artist Carsten Höller, the American artist Matt Mullican, and the Belgian scientist Luc Steels. The organizer Bruno Verbergt was closely involved with the curators. "The discussion revolved around questions such as the following: How can we attempt to bridge the gap between the specialised vocabulary of science, art and the general interest of the audience, between the expertise of the skilled practitioner and the concerns and preconceptions of the interested audience? What is the meaning of the laboratories? What is the meaning of experiments? When do experiments become public and when does the result of an experiment reach public consensus? Is rendering public what happens inside the laboratory of scientist and the studio of the artist a contradiction in terms? These and other questions were the beginning of an interdisciplinary project starting from the 'workplace' where artists and scientist experiment and work freely."

Artists exhibiting 

Mark Bain
Lewis Baltz
Oladélé Bamgboyé
Thomas Bayrle
Jef Cornelis
Anne Daems
Tacita Dean
Lionel Estève
Jan Fabre
Harun Farocki
Hans-Peter Feldmann
Peter Fischli & David Weiss
Michel François
Frank O. Gehry
Liam Gillick
Joseph Grigely (in collaboration with Amy Vogel, Anne Walsh, Stephen Baker, Robin Morrissey, and Alexandra Trencsèni)
Carsten Höller
In situ production
Henrik Plenge Jakobsen
Alexander Kluge
Koo Jeong-a
Rem Koolhaas
Laboratoire Agit-Art (in collaboration with Abdoulaye Ba, Jean Michel Bruyére, Djib Diëdhiou, Bara Diokhané, Mamadou Traoré Diop, Pape Omar Diop, Massamba Lam, Magayé Niang, Issa Samb, and El Hadji Sy)
Xavier Leroy
Armin Linke
Adam Lowe
Ken Lum
Sarat Maharaj
Erwan Mahéo
Kobe Matthys
Jean-Charles Massera
Bruce Mau
Jonas Mekas
Gustav Metzger
Jean-Luc Moulène
Matt Mullican
Gabriel Orozco
Panamarenko
Jason Rhoades
Martha Rosler
Rupert Sheldrake
H. Otto Sibum
Luc Steels
Isabelle Stengers
Meg Stuart
Rosemarie Trockel
Francisco J. Varela
Lawrence Weiner
David Western

References

Contemporary art exhibitions
Art exhibitions in Belgium
1999 in art